The Ezekiel Option is a Christian apocalyptic novel by Joel C. Rosenberg, involving the War of Ezekiel 38-39. It won a Gold Medallion in the 2006 Christian Book Awards.

Plot 
A hijacked Aeroflot flight from Moscow to New York is flying on a kamikaze mission to Washington. Once it crosses the D.C air exclusion zone and is within several miles of the White House, US President MacPherson regretfully orders the plane to be shot down. The resulting shootdown of the plane by F-16's kills all of the hundreds of passengers on board. Jon Bennett, the senior advisor to the president, proposes to his girlfriend Erin McCoy while in Moscow to finalize the Israeli-Palestinian peace treaty that he helped create. When Erin says yes, the story of the jetliner shootdown breaks out and causes a political crisis between the Russian Federation and the United States.

When they attempt to explain to Russian president Vadim what happened, Dr. Mordechai, the former head of Mossad, calls Jon to tell him he believes that the hijacking was orchestrated by elements of the Russian government, Iran, and the terrorist group Al-Nakbah to foment a crisis as a pretext for a potential coup in Moscow. Before Jon and Erin can relay this to President Vadim, Moscow, the Red Square, and the Kremlin are attacked by rebellious units of the Russian military. Jon and Erin are both injured in the ensuing gun battle in the Kremlin, where they both witness the Russian and Iranian cofounders of Al-Nakbah, Yuri Gogolov and Mohammed Jibril, execute President Vadim and his staff. After the "Second Russian Revolution" ends, Gogolov appoints himself as the new Russian czar and suspends all diplomatic relations with the United States.

Jon is released by the Russians and is allowed to return to the US, but not before he is brought to Gogolov where he is led to believe that Erin was killed. In reality, Erin was captured and is being held captive in a Moscow military hospital for the purpose of obtaining CIA codes from her. Gogolov wins over most of the world when he says that he has convinced Iran to give up its nuclear program when in reality, he is planning to transfer nuclear warheads to Iran for arming its missiles. After this, he travels to New York City to address the UN, where he reveals his plan for UNSC resolution 2441, to force Israel to give up its WMD's and adhere to Security Council resolutions within thirty days or Russia and other nations will be forced to take military action against them.

As this is happening, Dr. Mordechai and Jon deduce that the recent events have been prophesied in the Bible, in the War of Ezekiel 38-39. They believe it predicts that a coalition of nations, specifically referring to Russia, Iran, Germany, the former USSR republics, Syria, Lebanon, Turkey, Sudan, and the Arabian peninsula, will attack Israel, but that God will unleash the forces of heaven against them to prevent Israel's destruction. Because of these revelations, Dr. Mordechai recommends to Jon that he brief Macpherson and the Israeli prime minister Doron on his idea for the 'Ezekiel Option' as a response to the crisis. It outlines that they should put their faith in God to protect them, as an alternative to Israel's Samson Option, which recommends the firing of all of Israel's nuclear missiles against their enemies in case of invasion.

Resolution 2241 passes through the UN Security Council, with all members voting to pass and the US abstaining. Afterward, a coalition of nations, lining up perfectly with those predicted in the Bible, start to amass millions of soldiers in a large invasion force that begins to surround Israel. Enraged at the president's refusal to do anything, Jon resigns and goes to Iran to sneak into Russia to save Erin. Meanwhile, Erin manages to escape the hospital in Moscow and go on the run, but Gogolov frames her for being a serial killer and puts a bounty on her head. Jon manages to sneak into Russia and heads to Moscow to link up with Erin and the civilians aiding her.  

Exactly one day before the resolution deadline passes, Russia fires a nuclear missile at Israel, revealing that Gogolov had always intended to destroy Israel, (due to him being inspired by Hitler and his fascist ideals). Jon and Erin finally reunite in Moscow and attempt to flee while fighting off the Russian security forces, just as the world braces for inevitable nuclear war. As Gogolov and Jibril evacuate Moscow to get to a bunker, a massive storm mysteriously manifests outside of Moscow, destroying the helicopter they are riding in and killing both Gogolov and Jibril. As this happens, the coalition forces move to invade, but the incoming nuclear missile vanishes, and a massive and sudden earthquake takes place with the epicenter in Jerusalem, big enough for the whole world to feel. Additionally, massive fiery projectiles coming from space proceed to destroy the military, government, and religious sites of all the coalition governments, as well as all the forces around Israel, killing millions of people. These events prove that the prophecy had come true and that God had come to Israel's rescue, which persuades Israel to call off its nuclear counterattack. As this happens, Jon and Erin embrace in the fiery ruins of Moscow and proceed to return to the United States in a world forever changed.

References

External links
Barbara's review of "The Ezekiel Option" on Goodreads

2005 American novels
American Christian novels
English-language novels
Novels set during the Israeli–Palestinian conflict
Novels set in Jerusalem
Fiction set in 2014